Lectionary 52, designated by siglum ℓ 52 (in the Gregory-Aland numbering). It is a Greek manuscript of the New Testament, on parchment leaves. Palaeographically it has been assigned to the 14th century.

Description 

The codex is an Euchologium with lessons from the Gospels, Acts of the Apostles and Epistles lectionary (Apostoloeuangelia), on 244 parchment leaves, with some lacune. The text is written in one column per page, in 17-19 lines per page, in Greek minuscule letters. It contains also some lessons from the Old Testament.

History 

The manuscript was examined by Matthaei. 

The manuscript is not cited in the critical editions of the Greek New Testament (UBS3).

Currently the codex is located in the State Historical Museum, (V. 261, S. 279) in Moscow.

See also  

 List of New Testament lectionaries
 Biblical manuscript
 Textual criticism

Notes and references 

Greek New Testament lectionaries
14th-century biblical manuscripts